Sarasi Kumar Saraswati (1906 – 1980) was a Bangladeshi historian of art and architecture.

Early life and education

Saraswati was born in Rajshahi, British India. He received a  MA in 1930 from the University of Calcutta in of Ancient Indian History and Culture.

Positions
 Research Scholar, Varendra Research Society, Rajshahi, Bangladesh
 Lecturer and Reader, Department of Ancient Indian History and Culture,  University of Calcutta, Calcutta, India
 First Professor and Head of the Department of Archaeology,  University of Calcutta.
 Professor and Head of the Department of Ancient Indian History and Culture, Banaras Hindu University, Vanarasi, India
 Librarian of the Asiatic Society, Calcutta,
 Curator, Victoria Memorial, Calcutta,

Publications

Books
 A survey of Indian sculpture (1975)
 Architecture of Bengal (1976)
 Indian art at the cross-roads(1973)
 Glimpses of Mughal architecture in: A. Goswami (ed)(1953)
Pal Juger Chitrakala
 Tantrayāna art: an album (1977)

Book chapters
chapters on architecture to the  following books..
 History of Bengal, vol. I, (ed. RC Majumdar)
 The History and Culture of the Indian People, (ed. RC Majumdar)
 Comprehensive History of India, vol. II (ed. KA Nilakanta Shastri)
 Comprehensive History of India, vol. III (ed. RC Majumdar) and
 Jaina Art and Architecture, (ed. A Ghosh).

Articles
 articles on art and architecture of early Bengal, in the Journal and Proceedings of the Asiatic Society of Bengal   1932-34

See also
 List of architectural historians

References

Bangladeshi architectural historians
20th-century Bangladeshi historians
University of Calcutta alumni
1906 births
1980 deaths
Bengali historians